Arroyo Canelón Grande is a river in Uruguay.

It originates in the Department of Canelones in the Cuchilla Grande in the area of the locality of San Bautista. From there, it runs in an east–west direction to the border of the San José Department. Here, it flows north of Aguas Corrientes on the southern edge of the city Santa Lucía on the left into the Santa Lucía River.

References

Rivers of Uruguay
Rivers of Canelones Department